Tehan (–1874) was an American settler who was taken captive by the Kiowa tribe and was adopted by the chief Maman-ti.

Biography 
Tehan was a white captive, adopted into the Kiowa tribe. His name came from the native pronunciation of "Texan", where he was born. Under Maman-ti, he became a strong warrior and eventually fought in the Red River War, at about eighteen years old. He was captured by US forces, and even though he "thanked the soldiers for his deliverance", he was incarcerated. On September 14, 1874, he escaped from US captivity during the Battle of Lyman's Wagon Train, and returned to the native camp. He went on a raid with the chief Big Bow in Texas, and died during that expedition. Various accounts of his death exist. He was believed by Big Bow to give authorities all that he knew about the natives, and was possibly executed. Big Bow stated that he had died of thirst in the desert. But the Comanche stated that he visited Fort Sill to care for his mother after his father died.

Popular culture
Tehan's story is told in the Canadian film Dreamkeeper, he is played by the actor Scott Grimes.

References 

Kiowa
Kiowa people
Captives of Native Americans
1850s births
1874 deaths
Year of birth uncertain